Mikage is a Japanese surname and location name. It may refer to:

Fictional Characters
Mikage is the last name of fraternal twins Aya and Aki in the manga and miniseries anime Ceres, Celestial Legend.
Mikage is the surname of skilled assassin Kikyo in the Wolverine miniseries 
Mikage is also the name of Teito Klein's best friend in Seven Ghost anime
Mikage is the name of the original land god in Julietta Suzuki 's manga Kamisama Hajimemashita.

Locations
Mikage, a neighborhood in Higashinada-ku, Kobe.
Mikage, a former village in Kasai District, Hokkaido, now part of Shimizu, Hokkaido.
Mikage, a former village in Nakakoma District, Yamanashi Prefecture. Now a part of the city of Minami-Alps.

See also
Mikage Station (disambiguation) for train stations with this name